The Return of Hwang Geum-bok is a 2015 South Korean daily drama starring Shin Da-eun, Lee Elijah, Kim Jin-woo and Jung Eun-woo. It aired on SBS on Mondays to Fridays at 19:20 for 125 episodes from June 8 to December 11, 2015.

Synopsis
Hwang Geum-bok (Shin Da-eun) searches for her mother, Hwang Eun-sil (Jeon Mi-seon), who goes missing during a trip to Japan with her friend Baek Ri-hyang (Shim Hye-jin). Her search reveal the secrets behind her mother's mysterious disappearance.

Cast

Main characters
Shin Da-eun as Hwang Geum-bok 
Lee Elijah as Baek Ye-ryung  
Kim Jin-woo as Seo In-woo
Jung Eun-woo as Kang Moon-hyuk
Jeon Mi-seon as Hwang Eun-sil
 Kim Hye-yoon as young Hwang Eun-sil (Ep. #7)

Supporting characters
Shim Hye-jin as Baek Ri-hyang
Kim Na-woon as Oh Mal-ja
Jeon No-min as Kang Tae-joong
Lee Hye-sook as Cha Mi-yeon 
Sunwoo Jae-duk as Kim Kyung-soo 
Kim Young-ok as Wang Yeo-sa

Awards and nominations

References

External links
  
 

Seoul Broadcasting System television dramas
Korean-language television shows
2015 South Korean television series debuts
2015 South Korean television series endings
South Korean romance television series
South Korean melodrama television series